BBC Knowledge was a British television channel which was owned by the BBC and was launched on 1 June 1999, broadcasting documentary, cultural and educational programmes. It was shut down on 2 March 2002, and was replaced by BBC Four.

History

Launch
The BBC had been wanting to expand into the digital television market for a number of years prior to BBC Knowledge's launch. Originally this was by their association with Flextech, which spawned the UKTV network. Both companies had different ideas on how the new channels would be run: the BBC wanted the channels branded as BBC channels, but Flextech wanted the channels to contain advertising. The BBC refused, stating that no domestic BBC channel should carry advertising, and in the end a compromise was made. Two of the channels would launch as BBC channels, the soon to be BBC Choice and the then called BBC Learning, with the remainder of the channels being launched as the UKTV network, intended to be BBC in all but name. Prior to the launch, the channel changed name from BBC Learning to BBC Knowledge.

The channel launched on 1 June 1999, broadcasting for six hours each day. The new channel had plans to be a new, multimedia channel, operating across television, online and on interactive television, and showing educational and informative programming. The channel's original schedule style was initially a 'bright and breezy' approach to education, aimed at both adults and children, with viewers encouraged to get involved and contribute to the programming. Original programme included a GCSE survival guide based upon the popular BBC series "Bitesize", entitled "Bitesize Etc" and the technology series The Kit, aimed at children and getting them online and embracing digital.

Relaunch
A few years into the channel's existence, it was becoming clear that the channel's original format was not working in its aim of interacting with viewers and making learning fun. The channel was receiving consistently poor ratings, and the BBC decided to relaunch the channel. The relaunched channel was given a new visual identity, and became from 17 November 2001, a 24-hour channel, caused by the move of BBC Knowledge from the SDN to the BBC multiplex on the DTT service. In addition to this, the format was changed to a serious, documentary channel with scheduling arranged into 'zones' depending on topics.

Closure

However, the real reason for the shift in programming was because the incumbent government delayed approving new BBC digital plans. BBC Three and Four were planned to have launched in 2001 but because of the plans being delayed, instead the BBC decided to relaunch the two channels in the meantime with the new programming. It had been planned since October 2000 that Knowledge would be replaced with BBC Four. Eventually the new digital plans were approved. In February 2002 the hours were cut back for CBeebies to launch. BBC Knowledge was closed down in the final hours of 2 March 2002.

BBC Knowledge from mid-2001 was essentially a test platform for the style of the new channel.

Visual identity

The launch identity consisted of cartoon characters climbing 'ladders of learning' between clouds against an orange background. Illustrator Michael Sheehy designed the idents. A white, BBC logo with 'Knowledge' after it in capital letters was located at the bottom of the screen. The ident image would also be present in the background of the end promotions, channel menus advertising upcoming programmes, and in video links presented by members of the public. In addition to this, a DOG was used on the channel, located in the top left of the screen, which displayed the web address for the channel, linking in with the interactive learning element, however this was replaced with the BBC Knowledge logo before too long.

Later on, the idents changed to follow a strand layout, with different idents for each strand. These featured an object, before a fact about it related to the strand appears and ends on an image with the strand name shown clearly on screen, with a letter encircled at the centre of the screen. It is unclear whether these idents were replacements of the animated idents, or complementary to them, however it appears they complemented them, with these idents being used in the stranded sections, with the animated idents used for general interest programming.

Following the relaunch in 2001, all different idents were dropped in favour of a single ident, featuring numerous circles made out of different structures reflecting the new strands.

References

External links
 BBC Knowledge at TV Ark

Defunct BBC television channels
Educational and instructional television channels
Educational broadcasting in the United Kingdom
Television channels and stations established in 1999
Television channels and stations disestablished in 2002
1999 establishments in the United Kingdom
2002 disestablishments in the United Kingdom

it:BBC Knowledge
pl:BBC Knowledge